The  was a one-man kamikaze aircraft developed by the Imperial Japanese Army Air Force in the closing stages of World War II in 1945. The Imperial Japanese Navy called this aircraft Tōka (藤花, "Wisteria Blossom").

Historical context
The aircraft's intended purpose was to be used in kamikaze attacks on Allied shipping and the invasion fleet expected to be involved in the invasion of Japan, Operation Downfall, which in the end did not take place.

Because the Japanese High Command thought that Japan did not have enough obsolete aircraft to use for kamikaze attacks, it was decided that huge numbers of cheap, simple suicide planes should be constructed quickly in anticipation of the invasion of Japan.

Construction
The aircraft was very simple, being made from "non-strategic" materials (mainly wood and steel). To save weight, it was to use a jettisonable undercarriage (there was to be no landing), so a simple welded steel tube undercarriage was attached to the aircraft. This, however, was found to give unmanageable ground-handling characteristics, so a simple shock absorber was then incorporated. The cross section of the fuselage was circular and not elliptical as were most planes of this size and type; such a fuselage was easier to make.

Tsurugi had an instrument panel with some flight instruments, rudder pedals, a joystick type control column and a place for a radio. Flight controls included both ailerons and elevators and (in production versions) flaps.

The Ki-115 was designed to be able to use any engine that was in storage for ease of construction and supply, and to absorb Japan's stocks of obsolete engines from the 1920s and 1930s. The initial aircraft (Ki-115a) were powered by  Nakajima Ha-35 radial engines. It is not known if any other engine was ever actually fitted.

After testing the first production aircraft were fitted with the improved undercarriage and two rocket units. These may have assisted with take-off or may have been designed for the final acceleration towards the target.

Performance

However, it was otherwise unarmed, and heavily laden with its bomb, would have been an easy target for enemy fighter aircraft.

The controls were crude, the visibility terrible, and the performance abysmal. Tsurugi had very poor take-off and landing performance and could not be safely flown by anyone other than experienced pilots. There were fatal crashes during testing and training. However new, better versions  with improved controls and better visibility were under intensive development. The Japanese High Command had plans to construct some 8,000 per month in workshops all across Japan.

The war ended before any flew in combat. Individually, they would have been rather inefficient weapons, but used in waves of hundreds or thousands they could have been quite destructive.

Variants
 Ki-115 Prototype: Single-seat suicide attack aircraft. prototype version, tested during early 1945.
 Ki-115 Tsurugi: Single-seat suicide attack aircraft, production version.
 Ki-115b Tsurugi: Single-seat suicide attack aircraft. proposed version using larger wooden wing, none built.
 Ki-230: Single-seat suicide attack aircraft. projected version, none built.

Surviving aircraft

Of the 105 examples produced, two airframes are known to exist. One example of the Ki-115 on loan to the Pima Air & Space Museum in Tucson, Arizona from the National Air and Space Museum. Another, once displayed as a gate guardian at Yokota Air Base, was since 1952 turned over to Japanese authorities and is reportedly at a Japanese museum.

Specifications (Ki-115a)

See also

References
Notes

Bibliography

  (new edition 1987 by Putnam Aeronautical Books, .)
 Gunston, Bill. The Illustrated Encyclopedia of Combat Aircraft of World War II London: Salamander Books, Ltd., 1978. .

External links

Ki-115, Nakajima
Ki-115, Nakajima
Ki-115
Single-engined tractor aircraft
Low-wing aircraft
Aircraft first flown in 1945